Mahmudabad-e Borumand (also Romanized as Maḩmūdābād-e Borūmand; also known as Maḩmūdābād) is a village in Mohammadabad Rural District, in the Central District of Anbarabad County, Kerman Province, Iran. At the 2006 census, its population was 284, in 59 families.

References 

Populated places in Anbarabad County